The Grave Digger is the tenth studio album by German heavy metal band Grave Digger. It is considered the darkest album the band has done, along with 1995's Heart of Darkness. The lyrics are about dark concepts, some are inspired by the works of Edgar Allan Poe.

Track listing
All songs are composed and arranged by Boltendahl, Becker and Schmidt; all lyrics by Boltendahl.

Note
The 2006 re-issue by Nuclear Blast includes the 2003 album Rheingold.

Credits
Band members
 Chris Boltendahl - vocals
 Manni Schmidt - guitars
 Jens Becker - bass
 Stefan Arnold - drums
 HP Katzenburg - keyboards

Additional musicians
 Olaf Senkbeil - backing Vocals
 Hacky Hackmann - backing Vocals

Production
 Britta Kühlmann - recording
 Henning Winter - recording
 Jens Rosendahl - photography
 Markus Mayer - artwork, cover concept, design
 Chris Boltendahl - producer, cover concept
 Jörg Umbreit - producer, recording, mixing
 Manni Schmidt - producer
 Vincent Sorg - producer, mixing, mastering

Grave Digger (band) albums
2001 albums
Nuclear Blast albums
Music based on works by Edgar Allan Poe